The International Society for Affective Disorders is an international psychiatric organisation based in south London that researches mood disorders.It was formed in February 2004.

Function
It represents affective disorders for the World Psychiatric Association (WPA, in Paris). It produces its journal, the Journal of Affective Disorders. It researches chronotherapeutics, and subjects such as winter blues, which can cause large disorders in mood.

It holds the ISAD biennial conference.

Structure
It is headquartered in the London Borough of Southwark, at the Institute of Psychiatry, Psychology and Neuroscience (IoPPN, previously known as the Institute of Psychiatry) at King's College Hospital in Denmark Hill, on the A215 close to the boundary with the London Borough of Lambeth.

See also
 International Society for Bipolar Disorders

References

External links
 ISAD

2004 establishments in the United Kingdom
Health in the London Borough of Southwark
International medical and health organizations
International organisations based in London
King's College London
Medical and health organisations based in London
Mental health organisations in the United Kingdom
Mood disorders
Organisations based in the London Borough of Southwark
Psychiatry organizations
Scientific organizations established in 2004
World Psychiatric Association